Skënder Gega (born 14 November 1963) is an Albanian retired football player and current manager.

Playing career

Club
Gega played the majority of his career at Partizani, an Albanian team, whilst also having a two-year stint with German side Sportfreunde Siegen between 1990 and 1994.

International
He made his debut for Albania in an April 1987 Euro Championship qualification match against Austria and earned a total of 10 caps, scoring no goals. His final international was an October 1989 FIFA World Cup qualification match against Sweden.

Coaching career
He was appointed the head coach of the Albania under-19s in February 2011 where he remained until October 2011, when he was promoted to the head coach of the Albania under-21s.

During the summer of 2018, Gega joined Partizani Tirana, where he’d coach his team in the UEFA Europa League, Albanian Superliga, and the Albanian Cup. He won his first title as a manager, and the first for Partizani in 26 years. In June 2019, he left the club for personal reasons.

Honours

As player 
Albanian Superliga: 1
 1987

As coach 
Albanian Superliga: 1
 2019

References

External links

1963 births
Living people
People from Tropojë
Association football defenders
Albanian footballers
Albania under-21 international footballers
Albania international footballers
FK Partizani Tirana players
Sportfreunde Siegen players
Albanian expatriate footballers
Expatriate footballers in Germany
Albanian expatriate sportspeople in Germany
Albanian football managers
FK Partizani Tirana managers
Al Jahra SC managers
Albanian expatriate football managers
Expatriate football managers in Kuwait
Albanian expatriate sportspeople in Kuwait
Kuwait Premier League managers
FK Kukësi managers
KF Skënderbeu Korçë managers
Kategoria Superiore managers